The 2022–23 season is the 40th season in the history of Getafe CF and their sixth consecutive season in the top flight. The club are participating in La Liga and the Copa del Rey.

Players

First-team squad 
.

Out on loan

Transfers

In

Out

Pre-season and friendlies 

Getafe began the preseason on 4 July, nearly six weeks before the start of the national championship.

Competitions

Overall record

La Liga

League table

Results summary

Results by round

Matches 
The league fixtures were announced on 23 June 2022.

Copa del Rey

Notes

References

Getafe CF seasons
Getafe